The National Basketball League All-Star Five is an annual National Basketball League (NBL) honour bestowed on the five best players in the league following every NBL season. The five-player team has been selected in every season of the league's existence, dating back to its inaugural season in 1982.

Winners

1982 to 1993

1994 to present

See also
 List of National Basketball League (New Zealand) awards

References

all
A